Ferenc Nyúl (2 November 1896 – 30 April 1971) was a Hungarian football player and coach.

Career

Club
Nyúl played for MTK Hungária FC from 1913 until 1920, when he joined the Romanian side Hagibor Cluj. In 1921 he returned to MTK Hungária FC, replacing the Hungarian legend, Bela Guttmann. Nyúl played for the club until 1925.

National team
Between 1916 and 1920 Nyúl played four games for the Hungarian national team.

Coaching career
In 1937 Nyúl trained the Romanian team, Universitatea Cluj.

Notes

References 

 Alberttől Zsákig: Antal Zoltán – Hoffer József, Budapest, Sportkiadó, 1968
 Felejthetetlen 90 percek: Rejtő László – Lukács László – Szepesi György, Budapest, Sportkiadó, 1977,  
 Futball '93: (Budapest, 1994) ISSN 1217-873X

1896 births
Hungarian footballers
1971 deaths
Hungarian football managers
FC Universitatea Cluj managers
Association football midfielders
Hungary international footballers
MTK Budapest FC players
Hungarian expatriate footballers
Expatriate footballers in Romania